"Down at the Twist and Shout" is a song written and recorded by American country music artist Mary Chapin Carpenter. It celebrates the Bethesda, Maryland, dance and music venue Twist & Shout. It was released in June 1991 as the third single from the album Shooting Straight in the Dark.  The song reached number 2 on the Billboard Hot Country Singles & Tracks chart on September 14, 1991. The Cajun-themed song features backing from members of BeauSoleil, who are also name-dropped in the lyrics. Carpenter (and BeauSoleil) performed the song pregame at Super Bowl XXXI.

In 1992, "Down at the Twist and Shout" won Carpenter a Grammy for Best Country Vocal Performance, Female. It was also nominated at the Academy of Country Music Awards for Song of the Year, but it lost to Billy Dean's "Somewhere in My Broken Heart".

Alvin and the Chipmunks recorded a cover for their 1992 album Chipmunks in Low Places.

American Aquarium covered the song on their 2021 album Slappers, Bangers, and Certified Twangers: Vol 1.

Music video
The music video was directed by Jack Cole and premiered in mid-1991.

Personnel
Per liner notes from Shooting Straight in the Dark.
Peter Bonta – acoustic guitar
Jimmy Breaux – accordion, Cajun yells
Mary Chapin Carpenter – lead and backing vocals, acoustic guitar
Michael Doucet – fiddle, Cajun yells
John Jennings – electric guitar, backing vocals, Cajun yells
Robbie Magruder – drums
Rico Petruccelli – bass guitar
Billy Ware – percussion, Cajun yells

Chart performance

Year-end charts

References

1991 singles
Mary Chapin Carpenter songs
Songs written by Mary Chapin Carpenter
Columbia Records singles
1990 songs